Brigada en acción is a 1977  Argentine comedy film directed by and starring Palito Ortega and written by Juan Carlos Mesa. The film premiered in Argentina on 21 July  1977.

Cast
 Palito Ortega
 Juan Carlos Altavista
 Christian Bach
 Carlos Balá
 Alberto Bello
 Marcelo Chimento
 Nora Cullen
 Alfredo Duarte
 Golde Flami
 Coco Fossati
 Alberto Martín
 Evangelina Massoni
 Daniel Miglioranza
 Ricardo Morán
 Blanca del Prado
 Andrés Redondo
 Raimundo Soto

External links
 

1977 films
1970s Spanish-language films
1977 drama films
Argentine drama films
1970s Argentine films